Visual calculus, invented by Mamikon Mnatsakanian (known as Mamikon), is an approach to solving a variety of integral calculus problems. Many problems that would otherwise seem quite difficult yield to the method with hardly a line of calculation, often reminiscent of what Martin Gardner called "aha! solutions" or Roger Nelsen a proof without words.

Description

Mamikon devised his method in 1959 while an undergraduate, first applying it to a well-known geometry problem: find the area of a ring (annulus), given the length of a chord tangent to the inner circumference. Perhaps surprisingly, no additional information is needed; the solution does not depend on the ring's inner and outer dimensions.

The traditional approach involves algebra and application of the Pythagorean theorem. Mamikon's method, however, envisions an alternate construction of the ring: first the inner circle alone is drawn, then a constant-length tangent is made to travel along its circumference, "sweeping out" the ring as it goes.

Now if all the (constant-length) tangents used in constructing the ring are translated so that their points of tangency coincide, the result is a circular disk of known radius (and easily computed area). Indeed, since the inner circle's radius is irrelevant, one could just as well have started with a circle of radius zero (a point)—and sweeping out a ring around a circle of zero radius is indistinguishable from simply rotating a line segment about one of its endpoints and sweeping out a disk.

Mamikon's insight was to recognize the equivalence of the two constructions; and because they are equivalent, they yield equal areas. Moreover, so long as it is given that the tangent length is constant, the two starting curves need not be circular—a finding not easily proven by more traditional geometric methods. This yields Mamikon's theorem:
The area of a tangent sweep is equal to the area of its tangent cluster, regardless of the shape of the original curve.

Applications

Area of a cycloid

The area of a cycloid can be calculated by considering the area between it and an enclosing rectangle. These tangents can all be clustered to form a circle. If the circle generating the cycloid has radius  then this circle also has radius  and area . Therefore the area of the cycloid is : it is 3 times the area of the generating circle.

The tangent cluster can be seen to be a circle because the cycloid is generated by a circle and the tangent to the cycloid will be at right angle to the line from the generating point to the rolling point. Thus the tangent and the line to the contact point form a right-angled triangle in the generating circle. This means that clustered together the tangents will describe the shape of the generating circle.

See also 

 Cavalieri's principle
 Hodograph – This is a related construct that maps the velocity of a point using a polar diagram.
 The Method of Mechanical Theorems
 Pappus's centroid theorem
 Planimeter

References

External links 
 ProjMath Mamikon
 Proof without Words from MathWorld
Wolfram Interactive Demonstration of Mamikon's theorem

Calculus
Geometry
Integrals
Proof without words